Anggun Cipta Sasmi  (born 29 April 1974), better known as Anggun C. Sasmi or more often mononymously as Anggun, is an Indonesian-born French singer-songwriter and television personality. Born in Jakarta, she began performing at the age of seven and recorded a children's album two years later. With the help of Indonesian producer Ian Antono, Anggun released her first rock-influenced studio album, Dunia Aku Punya, in 1986.  She became further well known with the single "Mimpi" (1989), which was listed as one of the 150 Greatest Indonesian Songs of All Time by Rolling Stone. She followed it with a series of singles and three more studio albums, which established her as one of the most prominent Indonesian female rock stars of the early 1990s. 

Anggun left Indonesia in 1994 to pursue an international career. After two years struggling in London and Paris, she met French producer Erick Benzi, who produced her first international album, Snow on the Sahara (1997). Released in 33 countries, it became the best-selling album by an Asian artist outside Asia.  Since then, Anggun has released another six studio albums as well as a soundtrack album to the Danish film Open Hearts (2002). Her singles "Snow on the Sahara", "What We Remember", and "The Good Is Back" entered the Billboard charts in the United States while "In Your Mind", "Saviour" and "I'll Be Alright" charted on the Billboard European Hot 100 Singles. She represented France in the Eurovision Song Contest 2012 in Baku, Azerbaijan, with the song "Echo (You and I)". Anggun also ventured into television, becoming the judge for the pancontinental Asia's Got Talent, the French version of Masked Singer, as well as the Indonesian versions of The X Factor, Got Talent, and The Voice. 

Anggun is one of the Asian artists with the highest album sales outside Asia, with her releases being certified gold and platinum in some European countries. She is the first Indonesian artist to have success in European and American record charts. She has received a number of accolades for her achievements, including the Chevalier des Arts et Lettres from the Government of France, the World Music Award for World's Best-Selling Indonesian Artist, and the Asian Television Award for Outstanding Contribution to Asian Television Performing Arts.  She also became the first Indonesian woman to be immortalized in wax by Madame Tussauds. Aside from her musical career, Anggun has been appointed as the global ambassador of the United Nations twice, first for the International Year of Microcredit in 2005 and then for the Food and Agriculture Organization (FAO) in 2009 onwards.

Life and career

1974–1993: Early life and career in Indonesia

Anggun was born and raised in Jakarta. She is the second child and first daughter of Darto Singo, a Javanese writer, and Dien Herdina, a housewife from the Yogyakartan royal family. Her full name means "grace born of a dream". Despite being a Muslim, Anggun was sent to a Catholic school to receive a better elementary education. At the age of seven, Anggun began receiving highly disciplined instruction in singing from her father. She trained daily, learning various vocal techniques. To help further develop her career, her mother began serving as her manager, accepting singing offers and handling business concerns. At the age of eleven, Anggun began to write her own songs and recorded her first children's album.

As a preteen, Anggun was influenced by Western rock music artists. At the age of fourteen, she released her first official studio album, Dunia Aku Punya (1986). The album was produced by Ian Antono, an Indonesian rock musician. However, the album failed to establish her popularity. Three years later, Anggun achieved some fame after the release of the single "Mimpi"; the song was later ranked by the Rolling Stone Indonesia magazine as one of the 150 Greatest Indonesian Songs of All Time. Anggun's fame continued to increase with the release of subsequent singles, most notably "Tua Tua Keladi" (1990), which became her most popular hit in Indonesia. After a string of successful singles, Anggun released the studio albums Anak Putih Abu Abu (1991) and Nocturno (1992). The former earned her the Most Popular Indonesian Artist 1990–1991 award.

In 1992, Anggun began a relationship with Michel Georgea, a French engineer, whom she had met the year before in Kalimantan while touring. The couple married, despite a rumoured objection by Anggun's family, reportedly because they felt Anggun was too young . Georgea later became Anggun's manager. The following year, Anggun became the youngest Indonesian singer to found her own record company, Bali Cipta Records, and took complete creative control over her work. She produced her final Indonesian studio album, Anggun C. Sasmi... Lah!!! (1993), which yielded the number-one single "Kembalilah Kasih (Kita Harus Bicara)". By age nineteen, Anggun had sold over four million albums in Indonesia. She began to feel dissatisfied with her success in her country and began considering an international music career. Anggun later recalled: "[By the time] I was 20, I'd made five albums. I'd built my own record company. I'd produced my last album and produced some Indonesian acts as well. And I said to myself: 'I'm tired! I cannot achieve more than I already have. There's no challenge anymore'."

1994–1996: Beginnings in Europe

In 1994, Anggun released Yang Hilang, a greatest hits album of her Indonesian hits. She later sold her record company to fund her move to Europe, and moved to London for about a year. In a 2006 interview with Trax magazine, Anggun admitted to experiencing "culture shock" and having some serious financial problems while trying to start her new life in Europe, saying "I thought the money that I got by selling my record company was enough [to sustain life in London], but I began to lose money, little by little. I had to spend so much on taking cabs and eating! So I ended up taking buses everywhere and going to clubs to introduce myself as a singer." She also admitted that she "had to convert from being a shy, introverted, 'real' Javanese woman to being an unabashed, fearless, 'fake' Javanese woman."

She began writing songs and recording demos, but after a few months, all the demos she had sent to record companies around the UK were returned with negative replies. She began thinking about moving to another country, and initially considered moving to the Netherlands, but later decided on France. In 1996, her international career began to advance; she was introduced to producer Erick Benzi, who had previously worked with Celine Dion, Jean-Jacques Goldman and Johnny Hallyday, by one of music legends in France named Florent Pagny. Later, Anggun learned from Florent Pagny about how a French artist act on stage and communicate with audiences by accompanying him on his concerts and shows. Instantly, he became Anggun's mentor. Impressed by Anggun's talent, Benzi immediately offered her a recording deal. Later that year, Anggun was signed to Columbia France and Sony Music Entertainment. After a brief French course at Alliance Française, Anggun began working on her debut album with Benzi, alongside Jacques Veneruso, Gildas Arzel and Nikki Matheson. She learned French language by enjoying the French culture in terms of music, movie, literature, etc. One of her favorite TV series which helped Anggun to understand French was Hélène et les Garçons.

1997–1999: Snow on the Sahara and international success

Erick Benzi wrote her a first song, "La Rose des vents", then an album called Anggun whose flagship title, La Neige au Sahara, was chosen as the first single. This launched his career and allowed him to become known to the general public. The album was first released in Japan in 1997 by Columbia, a subsidiary of Sony Music. This version includes nineteen songs, three of which are in French. It was published in France in 1998 with sixteen songs including fifteen in French. Finally in 1999, it was released in the United States under the title Snow on the Sahara with only eleven songs, all in English. The album is marketed in 35 countries and Anggun ensures the promotion (United States, Indonesia, Italy, etc.) for three years. She is accompanied by a group of French musicians composed of Patrick Buchmann (drums, percussion, vocals), Nicolas-Yvan Mingot (guitar), Yannick Hardouin (bass) and Patrice Clémentin (keyboards). Worldwide sales of the record exceed 900,000 copies and it is certified as a "double gold record".

Following in June 1997, Anggun released her first French-language album, entitled Au nom de la lune. The album was a huge artistic departure from Anggun's earlier rock style, experimenting with world music and more adult contemporary sounds. Anggun described the album as "a concentration of all the musical influences of my life. I want to introduce Indonesia, but in a progressive way, in a lyric, in a sound, and mainly through me." The album's first single, "La neige au Sahara", quickly became a hit in France, peaking at number 1 on the French Airplay Chart and number 16 on the French Singles Chart. It became the most played single in France of 1997, with a total of 7,900 radio airplays, and was certified gold for shipment of 250,000 copies. Two more commercial singles, "La rose des vents" and "Au nom de la lune", were released to modest chart success. The album peaked at number 34 on the French Albums Chart and sold over 150,000 copies in France and Belgium. Anggun received a nomination for the La révélation de l'année award (Revelation of the Year/Best New Artist) in Victoires de la Musique (a Grammy Award-equivalent in the French music scene). She attended and performed her song on French TV show, Tapis rouge, and Céline Dion also attended as guest. They met each other in person for the first time and they sang Aretha Franklin's hits, Chain of Fools and (You Make Me Feel Like) A Natural Woman together alongside other guest stars.

The English version of the album, Snow on the Sahara, was released internationally in 33 countries throughout Asia, Europe, and America between late 1997 and early 1999. The album contained the songs on Au nom de la lune, adapted to English by songwriter Nikki Matheson, and a cover version of the David Bowie hit "Life on Mars?". For the Southeast Asian market, Anggun included an Indonesian song, "Kembali", which became a huge hit in the region. American music critic Stephen Thomas Erlewine from AllMusic called the album "a promising debut effort" because "she illustrates enough full-formed talent on the disc". According to Erlewine, Anggun "tackles polished ballads, Latin-pop and dance-pop on Snow on the Sahara, demonstrating that she can sing all the styles quite well." The album's first single, "Snow on the Sahara" was a commercial success, reaching number one in Italy, Spain and several countries in Asia, and the top five on the UK Club Chart. The song was also used as the soundtrack for an international marketing campaign launched by the Swiss watchmaker Swatch. Snow on the Sahara has sold over 1.5 million copies worldwide and received the Diamond Export Sales Award.

In North America, Snow on the Sahara was released in May 1998 by Epic Records. Anggun went on an extensive tour for nine months in the United States to promote the album, including as a supporting act for several artists such as The Corrs and Toni Braxton, as well as participating at the Lilith Fair (performing with Sarah McLachlan and Erykah Badu on stage). She also appeared on American television programs such as The Rosie O'Donnell Show, Sessions at West 54th, Penn & Teller's Sin City Spectacular, and received a CNN WorldBeat interview; she was also given coverage in printed media like Rolling Stone and Billboard. However, Snow on the Sahara was not much of a commercial success in the United States. The album peaked at number 23 on the Billboard Heatseekers Albums Chart and shipped 200,000 units. The single reached number 16 on the Billboard Hot Dance Music/Club Play and number 22 on the Billboard Adult Top 40. Sarah Brightman did a cover version of "Snow on the Sahara" song on her The Harem World Tour: Live from Las Vegas album in 2004. Also in 2008, Italian singer Ilaria Porceddu covered that song on her debut album called Suono naturale. The album track "On the Breath of an Angel" was later used as the soundtrack of American television series Passions and television film The Princess and the Marine, both of which aired on NBC.

2000–2003: Chrysalis, Open Hearts, and collaborations

In 1999, Anggun ended her seven-year marriage to Michel Georgea; this inspired her to record another studio album. Her second French album, Désirs contraires, was released in September 1999. It was an artistic departure from Au nom de la lune, experimenting with electropop and ambient elements as well as R&B music. The album was again produced by Erick Benzi, but it featured some of Anggun's compositions. Désirs contraires failed to repeat the success of the previous album. It peaked at number 48 on the French Albums Chart and sold about 30,000 copies in France. Only two singles were released off the album: the tropical-sounding "Un geste d'amour" and the R&B-influenced "Derrière la porte". Both singles failed to achieve commercial success, although "Un geste d'amour" reached number 62 on the French Singles Chart.
It was the English version of the album that enjoyed more success. Chrysalis was released at the same time as Désirs contraires and represented a huge artistic growth for Anggun, who had co-written the entire album. Distributed simultaneously in 15 countries, the album was never released in the United States due to the lackluster sales of her first album. The album spawned the hit single "Still Reminds Me", which received high airplay across Asia and Europe. It became her third number-one hit in Indonesia since her international career and her third top 20 single in Italy (peaking at number 17). It also reached the top five on the Music & Media European Border Breakers Chart. She released a single especially for the Indonesian and Malaysian market, "Yang 'Ku Tunggu" (the Indonesian version of "Un geste d'amour"), which became another number-one hit for Anggun in the region.

In 2000, Anggun presented her second album, still under the aegis of Erick Benzi, Desires Contraires. The record received little promotion and went relatively unnoticed in France. It has exported well, especially to Indonesia (platinum record) and Italy (gold record). The album was released under the name Chrysalis in fifteen Asian countries simultaneously, including Singapore, Malaysia, the Philippines, Taiwan and Japan. The song Tu nages on the track list of Désirs Contraires was also performed by Céline Dion on her album Une fille et quatre types in 2003. She joined Earth Day concert called Echoes From Earth. François Moity and Nicolas Yvan-Mingot compiled, rearranged, and recorded every soundtracks that played at the concert into an album. Anggun was the lead vocal on "Over The Hill Of Secrets" and "Songe D'Argile". She then made a mini-tour of ten dates inaugurated at La Cigale on February 1, 2001, her first French stage. She announced her departure from her first label in January 2003, then moved to Montreal, Canada, to meet up with her then fiancé. She toured Indonesia and chose to accompany her the young Julian Cely, who had become her musical godson. At the end of 2000 Anggun received an invitation from the Vatican, asking her to appear at a special Christmas concert alongside Bryan Adams and Dionne Warwick. For the event, she gave her renditions of "Have Yourself a Merry Little Christmas" as well as "Still Reminds Me". Her performance was also included on the Noël au Vatican disc compilation. The following month, she started a tour across Asia and Europe, including her first-ever concert in France at Le Bataclan on 1 February 2001. The tour ended on 30 April 2001 at Kallang Theatre, Singapore. In 2002, Anggun received the Women Inspire Award from Singapore's Beacon of Light award ceremony for "her achievements as a role model for many young women in Asia." On 2 April 2002, she held her Russia concert at State Concert Hall of the Tchaikovsky. The next year, she was honored with Cosmopolitan Indonesias Fun Fearless Female of the Year Award. Anggun had an interview with VOGUE Deutsch, Germany edition of VOGUE for a rubric called Vogue Trifft.

During this period, Anggun also did a string of collaborations, soundtrack projects, and charity albums. These included a mixed French-English song with DJ Cam entitled "Summer in Paris" (which later became a club hit in Europe and Asia for both artists) on his 2001 album, Soulshine; an Indonesian-English song with Deep Forest entitled "Deep Blue Sea" on their 2002 album, Music Detected; and three collaborations in 2003, including with Italian rock singers Piero Pelù, Serge Lama and Tri Yann. Her duet with Piero Pelù on an Italian-English song entitled "Amore immaginato" became a hit in Italy, spending over two months at the top of Italian Airplay Chart, and sung it at Italian Music Awards in 2003. Anggun also collaborated with Bryan Adams in writing a song entitled "Walking Away" which remains unreleased for unknown reason. The same year, her song On the Breath of an Angel, composed by her with Jacques Veneruso, Nikki Matheson was interpreted and adapted in Vietnamese by Mỹ Tâm in 2001. This title is engraved on the first album of the latter Mãi Yêu. In 2002, Anggun performed Open Hearts, the soundtrack of the film Open Hearts by Susanne Bier, released in 2003 in Scandinavian theaters. Previously, she has appeared in other soundtracks, Anastasia with Gildas Arzel in 1997, Gloups! je suis un poisson and Anja & Victor in 2001. Later on, her songs have chosen to be the soundtrack of Transporter 2 (Cesse la rain) in 2005 and the documentary series Genesis II et l'homme créa la nature  by Frédéric Lepage which was broadcast in 2004 on France 5. Anggun participated in two Scandinavian movies: contributing the song "Rain (Here Without You)" for Anja & Viktor in 2001, and the entire soundtrack album for Open Hearts in 2002. For Open Hearts, Anggun worked with two Danish producers, Jesper Winge Leisner and Niels Brinck. "Open Your Heart" was released as a commercial single from the soundtrack album and charted at number 51 on the Norwegian Singles Chart. It also earned Anggun a nomination for Best Original Song at the Danish Film Academy's Robert Awards in 2003. "Counting Down" was also released as a single and became a top-ten airplay hit in Indonesia. Anggun's work with Sony Music ended in 2003 due to the company's structural change after a merger with BMG Music. She composed a theme song, called "Human", for Abel Ferry's short movie Le bon, la brute et les zombies. She later moved to Montreal, Canada where she met Olivier Maury, a law school graduate, who became Anggun's manager. In 2004, Anggun and Maury were married in a private ceremony in Bali.

2004–2006: Luminescence

In 2004, Anggun returned to Paris and landed a new record deal with Heben Music, a French independent label. She began working on her next album with several producers, including Jean-Pierre Taieb and Frederic Jaffre. Anggun, who composed mainly in English, enlisted the help of several well-known French songwriters, such as Jean Fauque, Lionel Florence, Tété and Evelyn Kral to adapt her English songs into French. At the same year, she co-wrote a song with Ocean Drive's frontman, Gilles Luka, titled "I Believe (That I See Love in You)" for the winner of Eurovision Song Contest 2003 Sertab Erener's album called No Boundaries. In late 2004, Anggun released her first solo French single in nearly four years, "Être une femme", a song about woman empowerment and rights. The single was available in two versions: one solo version for commercial release and a duet with Diam's for radio release. It became Anggun's second top-20 hit in France, peaking at number 16 on the French Singles Chart. It also became Anggun's first French single to chart on the Swiss Singles Chart, peaking at number 58. Released in February 2005, Anggun's third French album, Luminescence, entered the French Albums Chart at number 30 and was later certified gold for selling 100,000 copies. The second single, "Cesse la pluie" also became a hit, peaking at number 10 in Belgium, 22 in France and 65 in Switzerland. According to Francophonie Diffusion, "Être une femme" and "Cesse la pluie" were the second and the fifth most-played French singles of 2005 worldwide, respectively. In 2005, Anggun also took part in the compilation album Ma quando dici amore, released by the Italian singer Ron. Anggun and Ron performed in the Italian-English song "Catch You (Il coraggio di chiedere aiuto)".

The English version of Luminescence—sharing the same title with its French counterpart—was released in Europe under Sony BMG and in Asia under Universal Music. "Undress Me" was chosen as the first single from the English version. Although it was not accompanied by a music video, it debuted at number 13 in Italy, becoming her fifth top 20 single there. It also provided Anggun with her first hit in the Middle East & Balkans, where the song topped the charts in Lebanon and Turkey. "In Your Mind" was released as the second single and it became a huge hit in Asia. "In Your Mind" got positive acclaimed in Mediterranean countries and Eastern Europe, including Armenia. The third single, "Saviour", was used as the soundtrack for the U.S. box office number-one film Transporter 2. Russian electronic music space composer Andrey Klimkovsky reviewed her album and he quoted in his blog that the album was successful and "Saviour" become huge hit in Russia.

Anggun was awarded with the prestigious distinction Chevalier des Arts et Lettres (Knight of Arts and Letters) by the French Minister of Culture for her worldwide achievements and her support of French culture. She was appointed as the ambassadress for a Swiss watch brand, Audemars Piguet. Anggun did a duet with Julio Iglesias on a reworked version of "All of You" in Bahasa version for his album Romantic Classics (2006). From 9 to 18 March 2006, she participated in a large-scale concert of "The Night of the Proms" co-starring various artists and classical musicians. She sang her song, "Cesse la pluie", did a trio number on "Hot Stuff" with Tina Arena and Jenifer, and joined as choirs on "Hey Jude". On 25 May 2006, Anggun performed on her sold-out solo concert at the Jakarta Convention Center, entitled Konser Untuk Negeri. She later on toured to few cities in Indonesia, such as Medan and Bandung. In July 2006, she served as the opening act for French-rock legend Johnny Hallyday.

In August 2006, Anggun released the special edition of both the French and English versions of Luminescence with three new songs. She made a large jump on the French Albums Chart from number 119 to number 16 (a total of 103 positions) with the re-release, making Luminescence her best-charting album in France. "Juste avant toi", the new single from the special edition, became Anggun's fourth Top 40 hit, peaking at number 28 on the French Singles Chart. Meanwhile, its English version, "I'll Be Alright", became her most popular hit in with over 43,000 airplay from more than 350 Russophone radios across the region. Luminescence was re-issued in February 2007 and peaked at number three on the French Back Catalogue Chart. In September 2006, Anggun performed with her song, "Cesse la pluie" at Sopot Music Festival Grand Prix in Sopot, Poland.

In December 2006, Anggun received the special recognition Best International Artist at Anugerah Musik Indonesia, the most prestigious music award ceremony in Indonesia. The award was given for her role in introducing Indonesian music to the international recording industry. Subsequently, Anggun released her Best-Of album in Indonesia and Malaysia, which compiled singles during the first decade of her international career, including three re-recorded versions of her early Indonesian hits. The new version of "Mimpi" was released as a radio single and became a huge hit in Indonesia in late 2006 to early 2007. Anggun later released Best-Of for Italian market with different track listing and "I'll Be Alright" as its lead single. She was also featured on German band Reamonn's single "Tonight". In the end of 2006, She released her music video for the last single in her album, called "A Crime" for English version and "Garde-moi" for French version. "Garde-moi" is co-written by David Hallyday and joined Anggun to be featuring artist in this particular song. This single reached number 3 in Ukrainian Pop Single Charts. In December 2006, she has been invited to perform this song at an ice skating competition, called Les étoiles de la glace, in Switzerland. She sang "Garde-moi" on the ice rink and was accompanied by two professional ice skaters who performed spectacular ice dancing in the background.

2007–2010: Elevation

Anggun did a performance Over The Hill Of Secrets and Panorama on music by François Moity and Nicolas Yvan-Mingot for the Gaz de France advertisement. Anggun was awarded Le grand cœur de l'année (The Great Heart of the Year) by French television network Filles TV for her contribution to social and environmental events. In February 2007, Anggun was invited as the guest star on one episode of the fourth season of Star Academy Arab World in Lebanon. She returned to another episode of the show's fifth season in the following year. She did a duet with Italian singer Roby Facchinetti and his son, Francesco Facchinetti in a song, titled Vivere Normale. Then, she has been invited to sing it in Italian music festival, called 57th Sanremo Music Festival (Festival di Sanremo). In March 2007, she did a number performance with Nicole Croisille and sang Croisille's hit "Une femme avec toi" on Symphonic Show for Sidaction. In December 2007, she received her second invitation from the Vatican to perform in the Christmas concert in Verona, Italy, along with Michael Bolton. She covered Bruce Springsteen's "Streets of Philadelphia" with Corsican group I Muvrini for their album I Muvrini et les 500 choristes (2007). She was also featured on the remix version of DJ Laurent Wolf's number-one hit "No Stress" for the deluxe edition of his album Wash My World. Anggun and Wolf performed the song at the 2008 World Music Awards in Monaco. Anggun performed at Make A Wish Foundation Charity Concert in Belgium to help children with life-threatening medical conditions. Maurane did a duet number on her song, "Ça casse", with Anggun.

In late 2008, Anggun released her fourth international studio album, Elevation, which shares the same title in both English and French. A departure from the style of her previous efforts, the album experimented with urban music and hip hop. Elevation was produced by hip hop producer pair Tefa & Masta who produced and managed many artists, such as Diam's, Kery James, etc. This album features collaboration with rappers Pras Michel from the Fugees, Sinik, and Big Ali. "Crazy" was released as the lead single from the album, with its French and Indonesian versions, "Si tu l'avoues" and "Jadi Milikmu", serving as the first single in the respective territories. Canadian cinematographer Ivan Grbovic was the director for its music videos. This song is charted at number 6 on Francophonie Diffusion Chart. Another single from this album, called "My Man" or in the French version, "Si je t'emmène" topped to number 11 on the same chart. This song featured rappers Pras Michel from the Fugees. The music video for its versions was directed by Jean-Baptiste Erreca. Anggun, with this album, had made her music travel to Russia with positive reactions there. In Russia, Elevation was released with an additional song, "О нас с тобой (O Nas S Toboyu)", which was recorded as a duet with Russian singer Max Lorens. Later on, she remake the song to English version, called "No Song", and Indonesian version, called "Berganti Hati". For "Berganti Hati", she got helped by Indonesian renowned director and artistic arranger Jay Subiyakto to make the music video. Prior to its official release, the album had already been certified double platinum, making it the fastest-selling album of her career in Indonesia. In France, the album debuted at number 36 on the French Albums Chart. Later on, one of her song in this album, called "Stronger" which collaborated with Big Ali, get chosen to be Anlene's advertisement soundtrack for Southeast Asia territory. For the Asian Edition album, she included a song which written by Morgan Visconti and Rosi Golan, "Shine". Then, Pantene used this song to be the soundtrack of its short movie commercial. On 6 December 2008, Anggun joined the panel of jury for Miss France 2009 election. Other celebrities alongside her were singer, actress and AIDS activist Line Renaud as president of the jury, film director Patrice Leconte, Miss France 2007 Rachel Legrain-Trapani, Belgian actor-comedian Benoît Poelvoorde, journalist Henri-Jean Servat and fashion designer Kenzo Takada. Chloé Mortaud was elected to be Miss France 2009 who become a finalist on Miss World 2009.

Anggun's four-year ambassadress contract with Audemars Piguet was subsequently extended. She was also chosen by international hair care brand, Pantene, and New Zealand-based dairy product, Anlene, as their ambassador. In 2009, Italian singer Mina did a cover from one of Anggun's song, "A Rose in the Wind", in her album
Riassunti d'amore - Mina Cover. Anggun made a promo tour called Anggun Elevation Acoustic Showcase and served only 200 guest seats on 24 & 27 March 2009 at Hotel Istana, Kuala Lumpur. She also made concerts in Indonesia and toured five big cities, including Bandung, Yogyakarta, Denpasar, Surabaya and Medan. In August 2009, she was invited as musical guest to perform her song "Saviour" at New Wave 2009 in Jūrmala, Latvia where she met her Indonesian singer colleague Sandhy Sondoro competing at that show. On 16 October 2009, she attended FAO World Food Day event, called All is Possible, at 4th International Rome Film Festival.

In early 2010, Anggun recorded a duet with Portuguese singer Mickael Carreira on the song "Chama por me (Call My Name)", as well as performing at his concert in Lisbon, Portugal on 26 February 2010. She collaborated with German electronica musician Schiller, co-writing and contributing lead vocals to two tracks, "Always You" and "Blind", for his album Atemlos (2010). Anggun was also featured on Schiller's concert series, Atemlos Tour, in 14 cities in Germany during May 2010. Anggun did a cameo for 2010 French drama film Ces amours-là directed by Claude Lelouch.

2011–2013: Echoes, Eurovision, and The X Factor

Anggun's fifth international studio album—Echoes for the English version and Échos for the French version—saw her collaboration with composers Gioacchino Maurici, Pierre Jaconelli, Jean-Pierre Pilot, and William Rousseau. It became her first self-produced international album and was released under her own record label, April Earth. The English version was first released in Indonesia in May 2011. It topped the Indonesian Albums Chart and was certified platinum in the first week. It eventually became the best-selling pop album of 2011, with quadruple platinum certification. On this stage, Anggun had won 56 platinum records in 26 countries, from "Snow on the Sahara" to "Echo (You and I)". "Only Love" and its Indonesian version "Hanyalah Cinta" were released as the lead singles and became number-one radio hits. The French version was released in November 2011 and reached number 48 on the French Albums Chart. "Je partirai", the first single for the French version, reached number five in Belgium. Anggun held her second major concert at the Jakarta Convention Center, Konser Kilau Anggun, on 27 November 2011. She later appeared for the third time at the Christmas concert in the Vatican. This time, she performed "Only Love" and "Have Yourself a Merry Little Christmas", the latter in a duet with Ronan Keating.

Anggun was chosen by France Télévisions to represent France in the Eurovision Song Contest 2012. She co-wrote the entry, "Echo (You and I)", with William Rousseau and Jean-Pierre Pilot. Anggun held an extensive tour to more than 15 countries in Europe to promote the song. For the promotional intentions, Keo, Claudia Faniello, Niels Brinck, and Varga Viktor are featuring in this song for special edition albums, each for Romania, Malta, Denmark, and Hungary. She performed the song at the Eurovision grand final in Baku, Azerbaijan on 26 May 2012, wearing a shiny metallic dress sponsored by designer Jean Paul Gaultier. The song finished in 22nd place with 21 points. Anggun later told the press that she had originally hoped to reach a place within the top 10 and was deeply disappointed with the final result.

In March 2012, Anggun released the international edition of Echoes with "Echo (You and I)" as the lead single. A special edition of Échos was also released in France, featuring three additional tracks. Following the completion of the Eurovision, she continued the promotion of the album. 

Anggun embarked on a concert tour in several cities across France, Switzerland and New Caledonia, including her sold-out concert in Le Trianon, Paris, on 13 June 2012. Anggun joined United Nations campaign, Earth Day: Save the Forest in Italy. On Valentine's Day of that year, she appeared as the guest artist at Lara Fabian's concert special on MTV Lebanon, where they sang the duet "Tu es mon autre". Anggun also toured 10 cities in Germany with Schiller in late 2012. Anggun performed at Les Fous Chantants festival in Alès, France. In this event, she was accompanied by 1,000 choirs. Theme event for the event was the most beautiful songs of the films (plus belles chansons de films). Anggun sang three soundtracks, "GoldenEye" from 1995 James Bond series, "Calling You" from 1987 film Bagdad Cafe and, with Patrick Fiori, "La Chanson d'Hélène" from 1970 film The Things of Life (Les Choses de la vie). At the end of 2012, she was appointed by Director & Chief Commercial Officer of Indosat, Erik Meijer, to be the brand ambassador of Indosat Mentari Paket Smartphone (Indosat Mentari Smartphone Package).

In 2013, Anggun served as the international judge for the first season of the Indonesian version of The X Factor, which reportedly made her the highest-paid judge in Indonesian television history. It became the year's highest-rated talent show in Indonesia. Anggun's involvement was also lauded by public and critics, with Bintang Indonesia praising her for "setting high standard [for a judge] on talent shows." She subsequently joined the judging panel of the television special X Factor Around the World, alongside Paula Abdul, Louis Walsh, Daniel Bedingfield, and Ahmad Dhani, on 24 August 2013. She participated on the concept album entitled Thérèse – Vivre d'amour, for which she recorded two duets—"Vivre d'amour" and "La fiancée"—with Canadian singer Natasha St-Pier. Released in April 2013, the project topped the French Physical Albums Chart with platinum record (sold 100,000 copies). In May 2013, Anggun released a greatest hits album entitled Best-Of: Design of a Decade 2003–2013. A new version of "Snow on the Sahara" produced by Lebanese-Canadian musician K.Maro was sent to Indonesian radio to promote the album. In this year, Olay management and Procter & Gamble chose Anggun to be ambassador of Olay Total Effect. She and Natasha St-Pier were invited to sing in front of Pope Francis on 7 December 2013 at Concerto di Natale XXI edizione in Auditorium della Conciliazione, Rome. They sang songs from Thérèse – Vivre d'amour. Anggun did a duet with Italian singer Luca Barbarossa and performed Christmas carol's, "White Christmas".

At the 2013 Taormina Film Fest in Italy, Anggun was presented with the Taormina Special Award for her humanitarian works as the FAO Goodwill Ambassador. Anggun with David Foster, alongside Ruben Studdard, Michael Johns, David Cook, and Nicole Scherzinger performed on David Foster & Friends Private Concert in Jakarta. She sang three songs, including Whitney Houston's hits, "I Will Always Love You", "I Have Nothing" and her own song, "Snow on the Sahara". She did a photoshoot with VOGUE Italia in November 2013 and had an interview with Vogue's journalist, Stefania Cubello. She wore Azzaro's and Louis Vuitton's stellar. Also in November 2013, she was appointed by President of Paris Saint-Germain (PSG) Nasser Al-Khelaifi to be the ambassador of the club. On 22 November 2013, she joined French General Manager and Marketing Executive of PSG Jean-Claude Blanc and Ambassador of Republic of Indonesia to France (2010-2014) Rezlan Ishar Jenie to launch the club official site with Bahasa for Indonesian Les Parisiens which Anggun was the icon of this site. She received the number 10 jersey which is the same number jersey of PSG famous striker Zlatan Ibrahimović.

2014–2016: Got Talent and Toujours un ailleurs

Following the success of X Factor Indonesia, Anggun was recruited to judge the other Syco's franchise, Indonesia's Got Talent, alongside artistic director and photographer Jay Subyakto, radio personality and actress Indy Barends, singer Ari Lasso, in 2014. To prepare for the program, she received instruction from Simon Cowell during the set of Britain's Got Talent. Anggun re-recorded her debut international single as a French-Portuguese duet with Tony Carreira, retitled "La neige au Sahara (Faço Chover No Deserto)", for Carreira's album Nos fiançailles, France/Portugal.

The duo performed the song at the 2014 World Music Awards in Monaco, where Anggun was awarded the World's Best-Selling Indonesian Artist. In June, Anggun launched her first fragrance, Grace, named after her name in English. Grace, eau de parfume, production was under BEL Perfumes label, Thailand-based on finest French and International cosmetics & perfumes creator. She and her management had the chance to visited Grasse, one of the city in France where produces best quality elixir for perfumery. It took two years to produces this fragrance. It distributed to Indonesia, Thailand, China-region and France. She did a collaboration a young Dutch DJ Indyana on a song titled "Right Place Right Time". Later on, this song was chosen to be the anthem of Dreamfields Festival on 16 August 2014 at Garuda Wisnu Kencana, Bali. In late 2014, Anggun recorded two duets: "Who Wants to Live Forever" with Il Divo for their album A Musical Affair and "Pour une fois" with Vincent Niclo for his album Ce que je suis. Anggun also released "Fly My Eagle" as an original soundtrack for the commercially and critically acclaimed film Pendekar Tongkat Emas. On 10 July 2014, Anggun was invited by Air France to perform at Air France Inauguration of Jakarta-Paris Travel Route. Anggun performed in Africa twice during 2014, for Roberto Cavalli's Casa Fashion Show in Casablanca, Morocco, and for the 15th annual French-speaking World Summit in Dakar, Senegal. She was invited by Pope Francis to attended at Concerto di Natale where located at Basilica of Saint Francis of Assisi on 25 December 2014. She sang "Malam Kudus", an Indonesian-version of "Silent Night" gospel, and Christmas carols "O Little Town of Bethlehem".

In 2015, Anggun, alongside David Foster, Melanie C (Spice Girls) and Vanness Wu (F4), was announced as a judge on the debut of Asia's Got Talent. Joined by contestants from 15 countries in Asia, the show premiered on AXN Asia on 12 March 2015. The Asian Academy of Music Arts and Sciences (AAMAS) also announced Anggun among its board of governors, as well as becoming the academy's first ambassador. At the 2015 Anugerah Planet Muzik in Singapore, Anggun received the International Breakthrough Artist Award for becoming the first internationally successful act from Malay-speaking countries. In order to celebrate the 120th anniversary of the birth of cinema and the music in it, twenty French musical artists decided to produce a compilation album of the most beautiful movie soundtracks, such as Pretty Woman, Dirty Dancing, Evita, and many more. It entitled Les Stars font leur cinéma. Anggun covered Bagdad Cafe's soundtrack, Calling You. This album peaked to no. 6 in France and 66 in Belgium. SK-II and Harper's Bazaar Indonesia honored Anggun as one of 15 Most Inspiring Women. She joined the "SK-II's Change Destiny" campaign and became a spokesperson alongside actress Cate Blanchett and Michelle Phan for its event in Los Angeles and she was chosen by SK-II management to be the ambassador of SK-II. Later on, Anggun with make-up stylist Lizzie Para and social media personality Chandra Liow sit on the panel as judges for SK-II Beauty Bound Indonesia in 2016. The winner of this show was beauty influencer, Mega Gumelar, and she with Anggun traveled to Tokyo, Japan, in order to compete with other beauty creators from across the globe in SK-II Beauty Bound Asia 2016. In exact same year, Anggun was appointed to be the ambassador of Aviation sans frontières (Aviation Without Borders). In June 2015, she was invited by Michael Bolton to perform a duet and as an opening act at his concert in Kasablanka Concert Hall, Jakarta, Indonesia. On 16 October 2015, Les Enfants de la terre produced a musical tale recorded album for kids called Martin & les fées (Martin & The Fairies) which Anggun play the musical role as "La Fée Doriane" (The Doriane Fairy) and recorded 5 songs. Other artists who joined this project was Yannick Noah, Garou, Lorie, Gad Elmaleh, Gérard Lenorman, Vincent Niclo, Patrick Fiori, Lisa Angell, Dany Brillant, Julie Zenatti, Natasha St-Pier and more. Anggun also recorded Frozen's "Let It Go" in Indonesian language, called "Lepaskan" with Regina Ivanova, Cindy Bernadette, Nowela, and Chilla Kiana. Disney Music Asia also makes an Indonesian language song "Warna Angin" and sung by Anggun. It is the interpretation from Pocahontas movie soundtrack, "Colors of the Wind". She joined panel of jury for Miss France 2016 on 19 December 2015 alongside fashion designer Jean-Paul Gaultier as president of the jury, singer Patrick Fiori, singer Kendji Girac, Miss France 2009 & model Chloé Mortaud, actress, model & author Laëtitia Milot and Rugby athlete Frédéric Michalak. Iris Mittenaere was elected to be Miss France 2016 who become the winner of Miss Universe 2016.

Anggun's sixth French-language studio album, Toujours un ailleurs, was released in November 2015 by TF1 Musique under Universal Music Group with her lead single, "A nos enfants". Produced by Frédéric Chateau and Grammy Award-winning producer Brian Rawling, the album revisited the world music direction of her debut international album with diverse cultures ambiance, such as Japanese, Colombian, Samoan, Spanish, and English. Toujours un ailleurs became Anggun's most successful album in France since Luminescence (2005), charting for 24 weeks on the French Albums Chart (peaking at number 43) and sold over 50,000 copies. It also became her best-charting album in Belgium, debuting at number 43 and remaining on the chart for 31 weeks (making 5 re-enters). The album's single, "Nos vies parallèles" peaked at number 47 on the French Singles Chart and number 39 on the Belgian Ultratop Singles Chart (her first top-40 hit since "Être une femme"). This single featured one of French musical legends Florent Pagny as he helped Anggun to pursue her career in France years ago and Columbian singer Yuri Buenaventura. According to Francophonie Diffusion, "Nos vies parallèles" was the third-most played French song worldwide during March 2016. Both Anggun and Florent Pagny traveled to Havana, Cuba, for music video shooting which directed by Igreco. Maxime Le Forestier's song, "Née quelque part", being rearranged by Anggun and her team, alongside Grammy Award-winning singer and UN Goodwill Ambassador Angélique Kidjo as she featured in this single. "Face au vent" was the third lead single of this album after "A nos enfants" and "Nos vies parallèles". In this single's music video, actor and dancer Benoît Maréchal being featured again after he did great performance on "A Crime" and "Garde-moi" music videos in 2006. Darius Salimi was chosen to direct six music videos for this album,including "A nos enfants", "Face au vent", "Toujours un ailleurs", "Est-ce que tu viendras?", "Mon capitaine", and "Née quelque part". To promote the album, Anggun embarked on a 23-date concert tour across France and Belgium.

She performed as a guest singer at Siti Nurhaliza's concert titled Dato' Siti Nurhaliza & Friends Concert on April 2, 2016, in Stadium Negara. She and Siti did duet for two songs, Anggun's hit "Snow on the Sahara" and Siti's hit "Bukan Cinta Biasa". In July 2016, she became second most influent person on Twitter in France. She being invited to have a role as a columnist and guest radio host on Europe 1 radio show, called Les Pieds dans le plat, by Cyril Hanouna with another French celebrities, such as Valérie Benaïm, Jean-Luc Lemoine, Jérôme Commandeur, Estelle Denis and Bertrand Chameroy. On 23–25 September 2016, Anggun attended Festival Film Indonesia (Indonesia Film Festival) at Cinema Spazio Alfieri, Florence. Anggun sang the acoustic version of  "Snow on the Sahara". This event was collaborated with Embassy of the Republic of Indonesia in Rome and Indonesia Meets Italy Association as the part of Settimane della Cultura Indonesiana in Italia to reflects the progress of the increasingly dynamic Indonesian film industry. Anggun received the Key to the City award from Dario Nardella, the Mayor of Florence, Italy. Anggun was featured on new-age music group Enigma's eight studio album The Fall of a Rebel Angel (2016), providing lead vocals for three songs, including the lead single "Sadeness (Part II)", which is the sequel to the 1990 number-one hit "Sadeness (Part I)". The Album topped US Top Dance/Electronic Album charts in United States. Kotak invited Anggun to did a duet with them in a song titled "Teka-Teki" in October 2016. Anggun joined Belgian-francophone charity show Télévie to raise funds to support scientific research in the fight against cancer and leukemia in children and adults. She sang her song "Nos vies parallèles" and a duet with Christophe Maé on his song, called "Charly".  They raised over EU€10 million. Azerbaijan-Russian singer-songwriter Emin make a duet song with Anggun, called "If You Go Away" for his newest album Love is A Deadly Game. The song was a cover from original song by Jacques Brel, called "Ne me quitte pas". Anggun was invited to be a guest performer and did a duet with Lara Fabian at Lara's concert Ma vie dans la tienne Tour 2016 in Brussels, Belgium. Anggun and Lara sang a ballad song from Lara's album Nue, "J'y crois encore". Anggun was invited by Indonesian television network SCTV as guest performer at Long Live The Biggest Concert Kotak x Anggun feat NAFF on 23 November 2016 in Jakarta. She sang "Yang 'Ku Tunggu" as an opening act and "Teka-Teki" as a duet with Kotak. She held a "three-dates concert" at Café de la Danse on December, 1st-3rd 2016. She performed 18 songs, including covers from Michel Berger's "Quelques mots d'amour", Maxime Le Forestier's "Née quelque part" and Axel Bauer's "Cargo". She was invited to performed on 24 December 2016 at Christmas concert in Parco della Musica, Rome. She sang two Christmas carols as soloist, "The Christmas Song" and, accompanied by flutist Andrea Griminelli, "La Vita è Bella". Anggun, alongside Rebecca Ferguson, Anna Tatangelo and Deborah Iurato, performed Leonard Cohen's "Hallelujah". For the encore, she with another guest performers sang "Happy Xmas (War is Over)" as assemble.

2017–2019: Television projects, 8 and Asian Games 2018 

 
She have done more than 60 showcases on France & Belgium tours to promote her French album, Toujours un ailleurs and finalized her performance on Festival international des métiers d'art (FIMA) 2017 in Baccarat, France. She returned as judge on the second season of Asia's Got Talent with David Foster, also American-Korean rapper, songwriter, and dancer Jay Park as the new judge on the panel.

On 12 October 2017, Anggun released a lyric video for "What We Remember" on YouTube as the first single of her new album "8". On 7 December 2017, An official music video of "What We Remember" was released on YouTube and she held the first performance of this song on Grand Finale of Asia's Got Talent stage. Anggun released her lead single "What We Remember" in December 2017. It was directed by Roy Raz and had to make the video in Ukraine. The album 8 was produced and distributed by Universal Music with other French composers and songwriters collaboration, such as Tiborg, Nazim Khaled, Nicolas Loconte, and many more including her husband. On 8 December 2017, she released her new album 8 and a release party was held at the Apple Store on Orchard Road, Singapore. The album "8" was distributed under exclusive license to Universal Music Asia and the album was released digitally worldwide on major streaming platforms, including Spotify and also released physically in some Asian countries. This album reached no. 1 in Indonesia, no. 5 in Malaysia, no. 18 in Singapore on iTunes. On Apple Music, this album got the highest peak on no. 7 in Indonesia, no. 21 in Malaysia, no. 30 in Vietnam, Top 60 in Singapore, Top 100 in Philippines, and Top 200 in Sri Lanka. Coincidentally, its lead single "What We Remember" was played in the background of the café scene on Korean drama series Two Cops episode 8. Throughout December 2017, Anggun and Universal Music Asia held a promotional tour throughout Indonesia, Singapore, Malaysia and the Philippines. The tour consisted of listening parties, showcases, and meet & greet sessions. In the Philippines, she did several performances in Eastwood Open Park Mall with Edray Teodoro as the opening act, in Uptown Bonifacio with The Voice Teens star Isabela Vinzon as the opening act and on Wish 107.5 Bus showcase. She was being a guest star on ASAP and 24 Oras interview. In Malaysia, she held Meet & Greet with High Tea Session for her fans to promote the album in St. Regis Hotel, Kuala Lumpur. The first single "What We Remember" was released by dance label Citrusonic and serviced to US clubs including remixes by DJ Lynnwood (DJLW) Ralphi Rosario, Antoine Cortez, Craig C, Dirty Disco, Sted-E & Hybrid Heights, Love to Infinity, Offer Nissim, and more. On 20 April 2018, she announced and release duet version for her brand new singles from her latest album, called "The Good Is Back" with Rossa and Fazura. Shane Filan collaborated with her on one of the singles, "Need You Now", on the deluxe version of his latest album, Love Always, that releases only for United States and UK regions. Her songs, "What We Remember" and "The Good is Back" from her recent album charted on US Billboard Dance Club Chart. "What We Remember" reached no. 8 on that chart for about 16 weeks long and no. 15 on Asia Pop 40 throughout 2018. This single became reached the Top 10 of the charts in UK, US, Spain, Germany, and also Indonesia. "The Good is Back" got in to the US Billboard Dance Club Chart and topped to no. 20 for 9 weeks. American blogger and media personality Perez Hilton wrote on his blog that Anggun's "What We Remember" could be compared with Sade's and Dido's songs.

She was invited for the seventh time by Pope Francis & Vatican to performed on 4 January 2018 at Concerto dell'Epifania where located at Teatro Mediterraneo in Napoli, Italy. She sang "Snow on the Sahara" and "What We Remember". On 5 June 2018, she was performing at night for Grand Opening Renaissance Bali Hotel in Bali. She performed at Notte Bianca as the main guest star on 23 June 2018. The festival were located at Piazza Martiri della libertà in Pontedera, Pisa. Anggun got photoshoots for French cultural society magazine Technikart and got six pages in it. From this publication, Anggun shared different views and angle about her figure in international stage. On her interview, she made strong statements about how Indonesia modern culture & freedom movement by her perspective which she had spoken up about fighting on corruption in Indonesia, feminism & women's rights, LGBT+, and Indonesian hypocrisy regulations, especially death penalty. In July 2018, she attended to European Latin Awards at Stadio Benito Stirpe in Frosinone, Italy. She performed "Undress Me", "A Rose in the Wind", "Snow on the Sahara", and "Amore immaginato". She won Best International Singer award there. Another guest star performer were Bob Sinclar, Black Eyed Peas, Gipsy Kings, Juan Magan and Carlos Rivera. Anggun performed at the opening ceremony of the Asian Games 2018 at the Gelora Bung Karno (GBK) stadium, Central Jakarta, on August 18, 2018. He sang a song titled "Pemuda", which was popularized by the Indonesian musical group Chaseiro  from the album Persembahan which was released in 2001. Anggun sang on over artificial mountains and waterfalls. She joined coaching panel for The Voice Indonesia Season 3 alongside Armand Maulana, Titi DJ, and duo Nino Kayam from RAN with Vidi Aldiano. Anggun was invited by high-fashion brand COACH to have great visit and did a number of performance for the opening of new branch store in Suria KLCC, Kuala Lumpur, Malaysia. Anggun attended the opening with her husband, Malaysian singers couple Fazura & Fattah Amin, Taiwanese singer Dizzy Dizzo and Malaysian-Singaporean actor Lawrence Wong. In November 2018, she was invited to joined French Navy and got a chance to operated Le Mistral, an amphibious assault ship and a type of helicopter carrier, for three days. She reported her experiences on the show called Noël avec soldats (Christmas with Soldiers) at Port-Bouët army base in Abidjan, Côte d'Ivoire. Anggun joined charades of various artist, such as David Foster & Katharine McPhee, Kelly Clarkson, Randy Jackson, Andrea Bocelli, Gavin Rossdale, Josh Groban, and many more, for the production of documentary film Silent Night — A Song for the World. She made soundtracks on two versions of "Silent Night" gospel, "Malam Kudus" in Bahasa and "Douce nuit, sainte nuit" in French which she recorded in London. She began the filming production process in Germany with help from Franco-German TV network Arte. This film was narrated by Hugh Bonneville and directed by Austrian director & film-maker Hannes M. Schalle.

In early of 2019, Anggun had tour throughout several cities in Italy, including Milan, Foligno, Bologna, etc. She toured in seven dates for this Intimate Concert Tour. All local medias felt enthusiastic with Anggun concert's which awaited way back to Festivalbar in 2006. France 2 and Radio France held a charity concert after a fire attempt damaged Notre-Dame on 15 April 2019. All of the benefits from this concert was donated for reconstruction and restorative actions of the building. Anggun was being invited to perform at the concert and she sang one of numbers from Notre-Dame de Paris musical, "Vivre". Anggun performed with David Foster alongside Brian McKnight, Yura Yunita, and several artists during The Hitman: David Foster and Friends concert series at De Tjolomadoe, Central Java, 24 March 2019. Anggun was invited to perform at the concert in two different cities, namely in the city of Solo, Central Java and the city of Surabaya, East Java. She sang her own hits, "Snow on the Sahara", "What We Remember" and "Mimpi", also Toni Braxton's hit, "Un-Break My Heart". On 5 July 2019, she and P&G held a charity concert, called Gemilang 30 Tahun at the Tennis Indoor Stadium in Senayan, Central Jakarta. The concert also featured performances by renowned singers Rossa, Yura Yunita, actress Maudy Ayunda, and rapper Iwa K, while artistic direction by Jay Subyakto and accompanied by her backing band from France, who will collaborate with Indonesia's Oni & Friends as music director. Anggun reportedly wear costumes designed by Mel Ahyar, with accessories created by the renowned designer Rinaldy A. Yunardi. Donations collected from this concert are IDR3,060,000,000 or equals to US$218,560.50. After the concert, she had another performance on Prambanan Jazz Festival 2019 as guest star, accompanied by her backing band. This was the third time for Anggun to performed in front of Prambanan Temple. On 28 July 2019, Anggun continued her Italian tour concert at Alpe Adria Arena, Lignano. Anggun with comedian Jarry, actor Kev Adams, and presenter Alessandra Sublet became panelists on Mask Singer and it became one of the most successful TV shows with ratings that reached nearly 7 million viewers. She eventually returned for another season of Mask Singer. She also returned with David Foster and Jay Park for Asia's Got Talent Season 3. Another surprising moment for her was her song "Perfect World" from Toujours un ailleurs topped to no. 5 in the first week to no. 18 on US Billboard Dance Club Chart in December 2019. Anggun does a duet with Luciano Pavarotti virtually at The Luciano Pavarotti Foundation and Anggun in concert which took place at the Simfonia Hall in Jakarta. Singers Giulia Mazzola (soprano), Matteo Desole (tenor), Giuseppe Infantino (tenor), and Lorenzo Licitra (tenor) sang with deep appreciation with Anggun in that concert. Their beautiful voices were accompanied by orchestral music from the Jakarta Simfonia Orchestra. Previously, Anggun has performed a virtual duet with Luciano Pavarotti on song called "Caruso" at the stage of the 2019 Asia's Got Talent Grand Finale.

2020–present: Further television works, music collaborations and acting debut

In January 2020, she attended to 24th Asian Television Awards in Manila, Philippines where she performed her hits there and got awarded for Outstanding Contribution to Asian Television Performing Arts. Due to the global pandemic of COVID-19, Anggun had to postpone her touring concert in several cities and canceled many live showcases from the end of 2019 until the beginning of 2020. However, she began to take another career in acting instead of music in this recent days. She took a part as Maleen Suthama in television movie drama Coup de foudre à Bangkok. This TV movie was the sixth part of the Coup de foudre à .... collection. The production was taken in February 2020 and located in Bangkok, Thailand. Actors who joined Anggun in this project was Blandine Bellavoir, Frédéric Chau, Mathilda May, Loup-Denis Elion, and many more. Also in February 2020, Switzerland-based fashion magazine BLUSH Editions made two pages for the interview and ten pages for "Winter Garden with Pinel & Pinel" section of "BLUSH Dreams". She wore watches from KERBEDANZ, Cimier and Louis Moinet, dresses designed by Tony Ward, On Aura Tout Vu and La Métamorphose Couture, wardrobe by SEYİT ARES & Victoria/Tomas, shoes by Christian Louboutin, and jewelleries by Bollwerk, Fullord, Thomas Aurifex, Vincent Michel & Valerie Valentine with furnitures by BONA fide & L'Esprit Cocon. In March 2020, she performed in Moscow, Russia. She sang a Russophone classic song called "О́чи чёрные (Ochi Chernye)" which means "Dark Eyes" in English. In Indonesian culture from West Java, this song was being rearranged and interpreted to a Sundanese language folk song called "Panon Hideung" which means "Black Eyes" in English. In April 2020, she did an interview for Harvard Political Review article and published it in two parts, Interview With Anggun I: Taking Time With Music and Interview with Anggun II: On Representing the World.  Anggun returned as panelist on the second season of Mask Singer alongside her previous colleague panelists. In June 2020, RIFFX by Crédit Mutuel published the result of a survey, titled "Barometer: Les 100 Artistes Préférés des Français (Barometer: The 100 Favorite Artists of The French)", which Anggun listed on number 97. This survey was conducted by YouGov with interviewing 1,006 French people (age min. 18 years old) on 1 June to 2 June 2020.  On 21 September 2020, she, accompanied by her husband, attended the celebration of 70th anniversary of Pierre Cardin's fashion house at Théâtre du Châtelet. This event was screening a documentary titled House of Cardin to honored the legendary French designer. It was directed by P. David Ebersole and Todd Hughes. Jean-Paul Gaultier, Christian Louboutin, Stéphane Rolland, actor Yves Lecoq, and journalist Patrick Poivre d'Arvor attended the event with many artists and French public figures. Musical documentary film about Christmas carol in 2018, Silent Night — A Song for the World, re-produced by The CW and took a date on 10 December 2020 for its special premiere.

Her latest duet with legendary Italian tenor Luciano Pavarotti made a great scene in European classical music market. Anggun attended The 3rd BraVo International Classical Music Awards on April 2, 2021, at Bolshoi Theatre, Moscow, Russia. She made a performance with virtual image Luciano Pavarotti and sang "Caruso". Another special guest performers are ballerina Svetlana Zakharova, Grammy-winner Ildar Abdrazakov, young Russian pianists Kirill Richter and Ivan Bessonov, Ukrainian young tenor Bogdan Volkov, star of the Russian opera scene Albina Shagimuratova and performer of the youth troupe of the Bolshoi Theater Maria Barakova. The audience will also had performances performed by Italian opera singer Massimo Cavalletti, Uruguayan bass-baritone Erwin Schrott, young Japanese pianist Shio Okui, and honored opera singer from Kazakhstan Mayra Muhammad-kyzy. Korean star Yiruma and Chinese soprano Ying Huang performed via teleconference. Among the participants of the ceremony is Charles Kay, director of the international concert project World Orchestra for Peace. At that event, she received a Duet of the Year award because of her duet on "Caruso" performances across the globe. She continued the Italy tour concert that has been postponed due to COVID-19 pandemic. She started first in Sassuolo on 11 September 2021 and she visited Palazzo Dulcale. She performed at Piazzale della Rosa and Valentina Tioli was the opening act.  On 12 September 2021, Aquileia was her next destination to visit and she performed at Piazza Capitolo di Aquileia.

On 2 April 2021, Jean-Luc Reichmann, Anggun and her husband shared a moment on shooting situation for her next film project. It was revealed that she will play her role in ninth season of detective-crime film TV series Léo Matteï, Brigade des mineurs (Léo Matteï, miners’ brigade). The production process began in September 2021 and will release in 2022 respectively. Jean-Luc Reichmann was the main cast for Léo Matteï role since 2013. Other announced casts were Lola Dubini, Laurent Ournac and Astrid Veillon. In June 2021, she was chosen to fill her voice as Virana in Disney movie Raya et le Dernier Dragon, a French version of Raya and the Last Dragon. Her daughter, Kirana, made her first appearance in this project as various voice actress. Anggun made her appearance as herself in online series called Profession Comédien on episode 48. This series was launched by comedian Bertrand Uzeel and directed by Fred Testot which the series told us about Bertrand tries to collect as much advice as possible from people in the trade, but nothing will go as planned. She and all previous season's panelist returned on the third season of Mask Singer and started the production in June 2021. On 21 June 2021, she with her husband attended 60th Monte-Carlo Television Festival. Anggun did a duet with Italian tenor Andrea Bocelli at Mattone del cuore on 25 August 2021 and sang "Can't Help Falling in Love" which she eventually sang solo "Snow on the Sahara" later on. On 30 September 2021, she and Moulin Rouge made a performance on "I Am What I Am" at 300 chœurs. She began shooting television variety show series called les Reines du Shopping spéciale Célébrités in September 2021. She with four another celebrities such as Jade Leboeuf, Clara Morgane, Frédérique Bel and Elsa Esnoult, have to compete one another to win EU€10,000 for their associations. In a brief about the show, it brings together five women, aged 18 to 70 and of different styles. Every day of the week, one of the five candidates goes shopping. She has a limited time and budget to get a complete outfit (clothing, shoes, accessories) and perform its beauty treatment (hairdressing, makeup). Her look must correspond to a theme imposed by Cristina Córdula. It will also have a list of imposed stores to spend their budget. During shopping, her progress and fittings are observed and commented on by her four competitors, who follow her on screen, in a showroom. Dany Brillant invited Anggun to did a duet with him on Charles Aznavour's "Désormais". This song was included into Brillant's Dany Brillant chante Aznavour en duo, a tribute album to the legendary French-Armenian singer Charles Aznavour. Anggun was invited to perform for the Opening Ceremony of 2021 National Paralympic Week at Mandala Stadium in Jayapura, Papua. Anggun sang Indonesia's national anthem "Indonesia Raya" alongside 150 Papuan children and her 90's hit "Mimpi", all orchestrated by Indonesian conductor Addie MS. Anggun and her husband got a chance to visit and explore Dubai. They were invited by CEO Dubai Corporation for Tourism and Commerce Marketing (DCTCM) Issam Kazim. She also visited Indonesia pavilion at World Expo 2020. In November 2021, she did photoshoot in Mauritius for 27th Edition of BLUSH Dream Magazine. Anggun was invited by Vatican to perform at Concerto di Natale : Ventinovesima XXIX Edizione in Auditorium della Conciliazione. She sang three songs, including "Silent Night"/"Malam Kudus" mash-up rendition alongside Francesca Michielin, "Have Yourself a Merry Little Christmas" with reggae icon Shaggy, and "Santa Claus Is Comin' to Town" alongside children choir called Piccolo Coro Le Dolci Note. She also performed at Christmas Contest held by TV2000 and sang her hit, "Snow on the Sahara".

Anggun announced that she participated on comedy-musical theatre show with broadway vibe, Al Capone, alongside Roberto Alagna and Bruno Pelletier. She acted as Lili, Al Capone's mistress. It will be directed by opera manager and Opéra de Monte-Carlo director Jean-Louis Grinda, composed by Jean-Félix Lalanne and produced by Jean-Marc Dumontet. The show would be performed on 93 dates at Folies Bergère and started in January until July 2023. The first screening of the show was held in April 2022. The album was released on 30 September 2022 at various digital music platform. Anggun and her husband attended the premiere screenplay of Tom Cruise's Top Gun: Maverick at the 75th Cannes Film Festival. Anggun alongside with her husband were being invited by Élise Boghossian to perform for EliseCare's solidarity concert at Olympia. She sang Black's song, "Wonderful Life", and "Snow on the Sahara". She was accompanied by her husband as her keyboardist. Mayor of Surakarta Gibran Rakabuming Raka collaborated with Shopee Indonesia, Embassy of Indonesia to France and Le BHV Marais to held a fashion exhibition and showcase called Java in Paris in June 2022. Anggun performed as a Javan female folk-singer, named sinden. She also accompanied by traditional dancer (arranged by Indonesian choreographer Eko Pece) and gamelan music. In August 2022, she re-composed Indonesian patriotic song, "Indonesia Pusaka", for Shopee Indonesia's ad clip in order to celebrate Indonesia's independence day on 17 August. After SKII, Anggun was appointed to be the brand ambassador for Switzerland-luxury skincare brand NIANCE. On 23 September 2022, Anggun joined a project, with Lorenzo Licitra, as a featured artist on the theme song and campaign for the 12th Festival del Cinema Nuovo, the international competition for short films played by disabled people, which was held in Bergamo, Italy. The song called "Eli Hallo" which written by Lorenzo Licitra and Giovanni Segreti Bruno. The music video was directed by Donato Sileo. Eleonora Abbagnato featured as the dancer and a boy with special needs in the music video. For the music video's wardrobe, Anggun wore Zimmermann and Missoni dresses along with Bernard Delettrez jewelry. Anggun participated as part of supporting artists on the French version of Studytracks app, an online platform that unites teaching method with music and cognitive science professionals. Anggun alongside the supporting artists sings classes' subjects from Cours Moyen 1 (CM1), equivalent to Elementary School level, to Terminale, equivalent to High School level, according to a method developed with neuroscience specialists to maximize the retention of information over the long term. Anggun recorded a song to learn about the "Philosophy" subject. Anggun was chosen to be the brand ambassador for a herbal drinking brand Acaraki Golden Sparkling.

Artistry and legacy

Anggun possesses a three-octave contralto voice, which has been described as "husky", "soulful", and "distinctive" by music critics. Chuck Taylor from Billboard commented: "Vocally, Anggun is a fortress of power, easing from a delicate whisper into a brand of cloud-parting fortitude commonly associated with grade-A divas." John Everson from The SouthtownStar noted that "Anggun is gifted with a warm, full voice that can tackle slight pop songs without overpowering them as well as swoop with depth and ease over heavier emotional numbers." Anggun received her first songwriting credit at the age of twelve on her debut album Dunia Aku Punya (1986). Anggun said, "I was writing songs all the time, but my specialty was classical piano and singing."

Anggun started as a rock singer in Indonesia, and was influenced by rock bands such as Guns N' Roses, Bon Jovi, and Megadeth. She was a big fan of Metallica. After her initial international success, she showed her versatility by changing her musical style for each album. Her later influences cover a wide range of styles from jazz to pop, extending from Joni Mitchell to Madonna. She told VOGUE Italia that she listened to wide range of artists from The Beatles to David Bowie, Billie Holiday to Leonard Cohen, up to Dave Grohl, P!nk and Bruno Mars. Anggun identified Nine Inch Nails's The Fragile (1999) as "the album that changed my life" and the band's frontman Trent Reznor as "the man of my musical life." Her other musical influences include Tracy Chapman, Sheila Chandra and Sting. Anggun, who studied Balinese dance since childhood, uses the traditional art in her performances.

Anggun's image has been compared to that of Pocahontas. Some international articles and magazines give a nickname for Anggun as "Indonesian Madonna (Madonna Indonésienne)" or even "Madonna from Asia (Madonna de l'Asie)". At the early stage of her career as a rock singer, Anggun was known for her tomboy look—wearing a crooked beret, shorts, studded jacket, and large belt; this set a trend during the early 1990s. Later, she has focused on her femininity and sexuality, emphasising her long black hair and brown skin. For this look she uses the work of fashion designers like Roberto Cavalli, Azzedine Alaïa, Jean Paul Gaultier, Dolce & Gabbana, and many more. Other couture fashion designers that Anggun often wears include Givenchy, Elie Saab, Victoria Beckham, Georges Chakra, Tony Ward, Blumarine, and Zuhair Murad. In 2001, Anggun was ranked No. 6 in a list of Sexiest Women of Asia by FHM magazine. Later in 2010, she was ranked at number 18 on the French version of FHMs list of 100 Sexiest Women in the World.

When promoting her first international album in the United States, she was reportedly offered a role as a Bond Girl in The World Is Not Enough, as well as in High Fidelity. Anggun declined to be labeled an actress and said, "I was born a singer. I won't go into another profession, because I think there are still many people out there who were born to be movie stars or models. My calling is music." As for commercials, she tends to be selective when choosing products to promote.

Anggun's success in Europe and America has been credited with helping other Asian singers such as Coco Lee, Hikaru Utada, and Tata Young. Malaysian singer Yuna asked Anggun for guidance when launching her recording career in the United States in 2011 and supporting each other career since then. Ian De Cotta from Singapore newspaper Today called her the "Voice of Asia" as well as "Southeast Asia's international singing sensation." Filipino music journalist Lionel Zivan S. Valdellon described Anggun as "a very good ambassadress for Indonesia and Asia in general". Regarding the role of Asia in the Western music industry, Anggun said "I think it's about time people know something more about Asia, not only as a vacation place."

Other activities

Philanthropy and activism 

In 1997, Anggun joined Sidaction, a French organization to help fighting against AIDS. Among her charity projects were Solidays (featuring her collaboration with Peter Gabriel and several international acts) and charity concert Echoes of the Earth in 2000, Les voix de l'Espoir in 2001 and Gaia in 2002 (featuring a duet with Zucchero on the song "World"). In March 2001, she is one of the many performers of the title "Que serais-je demain?"  as a member of the female collective Les voix de l'Espoir ( The Voice of Hope) created by Princess Erika in order to helped build a pan-African hospital in Dakar, Senegal. Anggun was involved in Global 200 by  World Wide Fund for Nature (WWF) to stop the degradation of the planet's natural environment and to build a future in which humans live in harmony with nature and Anggun joined Solidays or in French called Solidarité Sida, the annual festival for raising money to help people with HIV/AIDS in Africa and also to prevent the disease. In 2003, Anggun was involved in Gaia Project, an environmental benefit project, to raise awareness about the preservation of the environment, and joined a charity concert called Le concert pour le paix.

In 2005, Anggun was a part of a humanitarian project to promote tolerance in Hammamet, Tunisia. Anggun promoted a micro-credit program to help to empower women in Indonesia, and many countries worldwide. This campaign was organized by United Nations. Anggun was one of many French singers to raise money to help Tsunami victims in Asia. She herself also visited Aceh for a couple of days after the tragedy. Anggun joined Music for Asia Charity Concert in Milan, Italy to raise money to help victims of Tsunami in Asia. She has been invited to perform "Être une femme" in a concert, called Tous egaux, tous en scene in La Zenith, Paris, to fight for racial discrimination. In February 2005, she performed her song, "Être une femme", with Lady Laistee in Ni Putes Ni Soumises Concert to celebrate women empowerment and feminism. In the same year, she performed "Don't Give Up" with Peter Gabriel on United Against Malaria Concert in Geneva, Switzerland.

She also participated on the 2006 Fight AIDS, solidarity campaign held by Princess Stéphanie of Monaco's humanitarian organization called Fight AIDS Monaco. She also joined on a collaborative track entitled "L'Or de nos vies" with several other French musicians and called themselves as Fight AIDS. In 2006, 2008, and 2011, Anggun was a part of Concert pour la tolérance in Agadir, Morocco to promote a message of respect for others and differences, for peace, tolerance, fraternity, dialogue between cultures and for the fight against all forms of discrimination. Anggun was part of a humanitarian project, Contre la SIDA, organized by Princess Stéphanie of Monaco, to raise money to help to fight against AIDS. She did a charity single with several female French stars, titled "Pour que tu sois libre".

During 2007, Anggun participated in several environmental projects. She became the French-language narrator of the BBC nature documentary film Earth (Un jour sur terre), an ecological documentary film by Alastair Fothergill produced by BBC Worldwide, and composed its soundtrack single, "Un jour sur terre". After the release of the movie, Disney announced the planting of around 2.7 million trees in endangered areas including the Amazonian forest. She was appointed as the Ambassador of the Micro-environment Prize by the French Ministry of Ecology and Sustainable Development and National Geographic Channel.

In 2009, Anggun went to Nangroe Aceh Darussalam, Indonesia to promote the importance of mangrove forests. Her work was filmed by Gulli TV and aired in Europe, Mon Arbre Pour La Vie Voyage Au Pays de Anggun (My Tree For Life Travel to the Country of Anggun). She joined AIDES to raise money to help fighting AIDS at the same year. She alongside with other 75 francophone singers, including 60 French artists, formed a collective group called Collectif Paris Africa to participated UNICEF campaign on a charity song, "Des ricochets", in order to raise awareness about Horn of Africa countries war situation and help the victims, most of them are children, by this charity.  On 7 December 2009, she attended and was a part of United Nations Climate Change conference (COP15) in Copenhagen, Denmark, helping to spread an awareness message worldwide and to raise the importance of the for leaders of the world to agree and work together on this key issue that is climate change. She also performed at Dance 4 Climate Change Concert. She sang two songs as a soloist, "Snow on the Sahara" and "Stronger", and two songs as a duet, "Saviour" with Niels Brinck and "7 Seconds" with Youssou N'Dour.

In 2010, Anggun joined former President of United States, Bill Clinton, at the 2010 Clinton Global Initiative to kick off "a Healthy Hair for Healthy Water" campaign with another public figures, such as philanthropist & creator of United Nations Foundation Ted Turner and supermodel & activist Gisele Bündchen. This event was to help the CSDW (Children's Safe Drinking Water) achieve its dream to "save a life every hour" in the developing countries around the world by providing two billion liters of clean water every year by 2020. At the same year, she with Daniel Powter, Lara Fabian, M. Pokora, Caroline Costa, Natasha St. Pier, Justin Nozuka, Sofia Essaïdi, Tom Frager, Christophe Willem, Jenifer, Bob Sinclar, Joachim Garraud and other 33 artists, credited as Collectif Artistes, appeared and featured in AIDES's album Message, specifically in a song called If, to dedicated for all the victims of AIDS worldwide.

On 1 July 2011, she appeared on game show called N'oubliez pas les paroles!, a French version of international series Don't Forget the Lyrics! with Thierry Amiel where they won EU€50,000 and donated those prizes to Sidaction.  In 2011, Anggun joined charity show marathon, called Téléthon. Over EU€86 million have been collected so far to the benefit of the fight for children rare diseases, including muscular dystrophy syndrome. She co-signed an appeal with several artists and artistic personalities in favor of marriage for all and urged the French government to give the right of access to adoption for homosexual couples. She with other 40 musical artists, including will.i.am and Carly Rae Jepsen, joined a campaign project which held by La Voix de l'enfant and My Major Company to made a collective charity album called Les Voix de l'Enfant. The album sold over 50,000 copies and gained EU€100,000. She participated in its single, Je reprends ma route. She joined UNICEF campaign to help children in Africa. She participated as a performer at Association Laurette Fugain's concert,Départ Immédiat. She performed a duet with Tina Arena on "No More Tears (Enough Is Enough)." Anggun with Zlatan Ibrahimović and Nasser Al-Khelaifi attended the PSG's charity event Fondation du PSG in November 2013 to help children with need. This event succeed to collect funds around EU€190,000 or equivalent to US$221,191.35.

Anggun promoted a pressure to put an end against discrimination, child labor, forcing young girls into marriage, and prostitution at World Without Walls  congress on 9 November 2014 in Berlin, Germany. Anggun, David Foster, Melanie C and Vanness Wu later collaborated on a cover version of Earth, Wind & Fire's "Let's Groove" as the charity single for Nepal earthquake relief. In 2015, Anggun became the ambassador of charity organization La Voix de l'enfant (The Voice of the Children). Les Enfants de la terre made collaborative project with several artists, including Anggun, to launched a musical tale album for kids and it was called Martin & les fées (Martin & The Fairies). For every  EU€1 from its sale, all was donated to Les Enfants de la terre for giving help and aids to children with disability. She joined ‘’The Pansy Project’’, a website to denounces the cruelty of homophobia actions against LGBT communities in the world, iniated by Paul Harfleet. This project also planted Pansy on locations where homophobia action was committed. She made through one of important newspaper in France Libération or so called Libé which she made a strong stands about supporting LGBT community, sent an open letter for President of Indonesia Joko Widodo about death sentence of Serge Atlaoui, told about her new album Toujours un ailleurs, her newest updates in life, and many more. She attended 2015 United Nations Climate Change Conference (COP21) in Paris. She met Indigenous Peoples' Alliance of Nusantara (AMAN) and Indonesia Nature Film Society (Infis) when she shares her views on indigenous peoples' rights, climate change and the role we all have to play in this short interview. She did an interview with advocacy group, If Not Us, Then Who?. She was appointed to be the narrator of a documentary film titled Our Fight which broadcast through this event and France featuring stories from Kalimantan and Sumatra. She joined a campaigned advertisement called Une bonne claque by short clip for COP21 which aired on France 2. She told how we can contribute to the environment by giving little tips that help the Earth from climate change. Anggun went to Madagascar to help children with chronic diseases to get medical treatment with Aviation sans frontières. She attended at 2016 United Nations Climate Change Conference (COP22) in Marrakech, Morocco. She sang "La Neige au Sahara" and "Cesse la pluie", also did a duet with Youssou N'Dour for the fourth time on his song titled "7 Seconds".

Anggun alongside singer Monsieur Nov, actor Frédéric Chau, PSG goalkeeper Alphonse Areola, rugby player François Trinh-Duc, journalist Émilie Tran Nguyen & Raphaël Yem, chef Pierre Sang, entrepreneur Paul Duan and other Asian origin-French personalities joined a campaign clip called #Asiatiquesdefrance initiated by France 2 journalist Hélène Lam Trong and produced by journalist Mélissa Theuriau to stop Asian hate and to fight against Asian stereotyping in France. In May 2017, she attended a charity event titled The Global Gift Gala, which was held by Eva Longoria Charity Organization and The Eva Longoria Foundation with UNICEF and The Global Gift Foundation collaboration, in Paris. Anggun joined the panel of judges for the Picture This Festival for the Planet short film competition. In the event new filmmakers, storytellers, and those who feel they can change the whole world, will compete with each other. The announcement of Anggun's involvement was conveyed by Sony Pictures Television Networks (SPTN) in collaboration with the United Nations Foundation. On the Picture This Festival for the Planet judges panel, there was Anggun together with actress and advocate Megan Boone from TV series The Blacklist, President of United Nations Foundation Elizabeth Cousens, MD & CEO of Sony Pictures Networks India N. P. Singh, co-presidents & founders of Sony Pictures Classics Tom Bernard & Michael Barker, U.S. President & Chief Creative Officer of WeTransfer Damian Bradfield, as well as other prominent industry & environmental activism leaders.

In April 2018, Anggun with Milène Guermont, Axelle Red, soprano Pilar Jurado, Sylvie Hoarau from Brigitte, French rock group Blankass, Joyce Jonathan, Irish singer Eleanor McEvoy, and German composer Alexander Zuckowski joined Transfer of Value/Value Gap press conference with the members of the European Parliament Virginie Rozière, Silvia Costa and Axel Voss, also European Grouping of Societies of Authors and Composers (GESAC) & Société des auteurs, compositeurs et éditeurs de musique (SACEM) delegates. They discussed about this topic and copyright problems with President of Institute for Digital Fundamental (IDF) Rights Jean-Marie Cavada. Anggun and those artists later on joined mass online campaign titled #MakeInternetFair. This main action was to ensure that user upload platforms, like YouTube, Facebook and SoundCloud properly share the revenues they generate with the songwriters and composers whose musical works they use, addressing the so-called ‘transfer of value’ or ‘value gap’. On 17 June 2018, she was performing with French composer and musician François Meïmoun at Centre Pompidou for 55th Anniversary of Fédération Française Sésame Autisme, is a French non-profit association of parents of children and adults with autism. She sang a song called "Blocus" which she co-wrote it with François Meïmoun and Thomas Fasquerras and became the soundtrack of the event. Its lyrics were mixed up French and Indonesian language. On 26 June 2018, she was officially participating #TheFreaks, a collective of 68 French artists, such as Zazie, Pascal Obispo, and more, who are sensitive to the defense of the environment and the protection of our ecosystems. This was an initiative action from French electro-rock band Shaka Ponk. Therefore, they committed to adopting new behaviors to fight over-consumption, pollution, global warming and protect biodiversity.

On 19 January 2019, she performed at the Teatro Odeon, Ponsacco to helped campaign of charity music event Monte Serra by Music for Life Association with another artists such as Matteo Becucci and Jonathan Canini. In March 2019, Anggun alongside Yann Arthus-Bertrand, Paul Lynch, Zaz, Kate Atkinson, Joanna Trollope, and more than 450 artists, authors, writers, also journalists all over Europe signed the petition & open letter to European Parliament in Strasbourg. The open letter forced the Parliament to think more about the future of copyright and protection for European creators with strict regulations. Anggun and those artists-journalists held a campaign #Yes2Copyright to raise awareness among European citizen about the importance and consequences of this problem. On 5 July 2019, she staged a charity concert, called Gemilang 30 Tahun at the Tennis Indoor Stadium in Senayan, Central Jakarta, and sponsored by consumer goods producer P&G, the concert's theme is titled, Unify the Tunes, Make Indonesian Children's Dreams Come True. According to a post on the Instagram account of children's welfare foundation @savechildren_id, the funds be used to construct 100 classrooms in schools affected by natural disasters in Palu and Donggala in Central Sulawesi, Lombok in West Nusa Tenggara, Sumba Island in East Nusa Tenggara and West Java. Donations collected from this concert are IDR3,060,000,000 or equals to US$218,560.50. As the part of charity event, Anggun auctioned off his shoes which are products from designer Christian Louboutin type 'circus city spiked cutout gold' which has an initial price of US$1,295. Anggun committed to reversing the biodiversity loss curve by joining WWF France #PasLeDernier campaign. Anggun joined WWF Indonesia collaboration's campaign and awareness program to protect Sumatran elephant, called A Night for Wildlife Preservation in Indonesia, on 13 November 2019 at Embassy of Indonesia, Paris. There were Muslim, Gayo elephant activist, Indonesian singer and founder of Teman Gajah (Friend of Elephant) Tulus, 2019-2021 Indonesian Ambassador to France Arrmanatha Christiawan Nasir, and Paris Peace Forum steering committee Yenny Wahid.

On 17 July 2020, she became leader of the panelist or investigateur, while Cartman and Chris Marques were the member of her team, on television reality show Good Singers, an adapted Korean television program I Can See Your Voice. She won EU€28,500 or equivalent to US$33,082.77 and she donated those prize to Aviation sans frontières. Another team was led by Amir while Julie Zenatti and Titoff were the member of his team. She performed a song "Lady Marmalade" with legendary cabaret dance troupe Moulin Rouge on 25 June 2020 at TV special for charity event 100 ans de comédies musicales : les stars chantent pour Sidaction to fight against AIDS, even though COVID-19 pandemic was roaming. In December 2020, she shared a video from The Pansy Project (Les Pensées de Paul), which was a 2015 documentary film by English artist-activist Paul Harfleet that denounces homophobia and violence against the LGBT community. The film was directed by Jean-Baptiste Erreca. Anggun was a cameo in the promotional trailer of the documentary and her song, called "Try", was chosen to be the soundtrack of the documentary.

In April 2021, Anggun alongside 35 French celebrities, such as Patrice Leconte, Iris Mittenaere, Chimene Badi, Ibrahim Maalouf and more, joined solidarity raffle held by Laurette Fugain Association, an association that aims to fight leukemia. It owes its name to Laurette Fugain, the daughter of Stéphanie and Michel Fugain, who died in 2002 cause of this disease at the age of 22. To joined this raffle, the persons had to buy one or more EU€10 tickets donation from 31 March to 31 May 2021. If they got lucky and win this raffle, each one of the winners got the chance to meet one of those celebrities in person. On 14 June 2021, she was invited to perform in order to support and celebrate World Blood Donor Day 2021 at Auditorium Parco della Musica in Rome, Italy. At that event, she sang three songs and was appointed as an International Ambassador of the Blood Donors by WHO, Ministry of Health and President of the Republic. 
Anggun performed in Aquileia as her continued Italia tour. This tour concert was part of Le Note del Dono project to celebrated the anniversary of Fratres group which the idea of this project came from Italian artistic director Marco Vanni. This project aims to promote, through music, the culture of total donation, such as blood, blood components, organs, tissues, stem cells, cord, and medulla - which style of life that safeguards health and well-being and that is moved by human solidarity, civic conscience and, for those who believe, by charity. The donation of a country's biological material is an index of civilization and every gift is a free human drug that saves lives. On 25 August 2021, Anggun joined Italy solidarity event, Mattone del cuore, held by Paolo Brosio's Olimpiadi del Cuore Association and Fondazione della Nazionale Cantanti in Forte dei Marmi. This event was held for Italian families in difficulty after COVID-19 who may have dependent people with physical or mental disability or associations that deal with psychic or physical disabled people, and in part to the great project Mattone del Cuore Primo Pronto Soccorso di Medjiugorie (Bosnia Erzegovina) and in third world countries for the care and assistance of children patients with leukemia and blood cancers to treat them directly in their countries and in their hospitals with the assistance of the best specialists in the world. A project managed by the Cure2Children Association of Florence. Anggun and several French celebrities joined donation campaign called Winter Time 2021 which held by Imagine For Margo - Children Without Cancer Association and Comité du Faubourg Saint-Honoré. She donated her pair of shoes which designed by Christian Louboutin. Anggun made a visit to a special need public school, namely Sekolah Luar Biasa Negeri Pembina in Jayapura, in order to support the teacher, parents, and disability students there as solidarity campaign and social project for 2021 National Paralympic Week.

On 15 January 2022, she attended as guest for Spectaculaire on France 2, a charity family TV show which brings together on stage the best numbers of performances from all the disciplines and honors prestigious artists from all over the world with exhibits exceptional performances, such as acrobatic roller skating, aerial hoop, flaming Cyr wheel, etc. She sang "Caruso" featured virtual "Luciano Pavarotti". This show's particular episode had collected EU€140,000 and donated those prizes to Aviation sans frontières. Anggun alongside with her husband were being invited by Élise Boghossian to perform for EliseCare's solidarity concert at Olympia. This concert was being held as a solidarity act for children who were victimized by the war in Iraq, Syria, Armenia, Lebanon, Ethiopia and Ukraine. Anggun became a leader of the panelists again on Good Singer (season 3) second episode, with Booder and Diane Leyre were the member of her team. She won over Joyce Jonathan for EU€13,500 and donated to Aviation sans frontières.

Ambassadorship 

She was appointed as the spokesperson for the International Year of Microcredit, a United Nations program aimed at eradicating debt in the third world, In 2009, Anggun was appointed as the Goodwill Ambassador for the Food and Agriculture Organization (FAO), part of the United Nations. On 15 October 2009, she performed on the occasion of the World Food Day Ceremony at UN headquarters Plenary Hall in New York, New York. She attended Rome Film Festival on the next day and spoke as UN Goodwill Ambassador at TeleFood Campaign Against Hunger in The World. Anggun as FAO Goodwill Ambassador have been named by the United Nations as MDG Champions on 1 September 2010. The announcement was made at UN headquarters in New York. FAO Goodwill Ambassadors, such as Italian actor Raoul Bova, Canadian singer Céline Dion, Filipino singer Lea Salonga and American actress Susan Sarandon, spoke with one voice in an urgent appeal on behalf of the more than one billion people living in chronic hunger worldwide.  Anggun, who has also appeared in a French film, promoted one of the campaigns she participated in, namely 1 Billion Hungry Project. The '1 Billion Hungry Project is also a program from FAO from the United Nations to raise our awareness that in 2010, there were 925 million people who were still hungry. This campaign asks the public to sign a petition to pressure government leaders to be more active in eradicating poverty. According to Anggun, by word of mouth promotion or through social networks will increase the number of signatures for this petition. “Spread the words! Anyway, I will always tweet, I will always post on Facebook, just to wake the people up in everywhere," said Anggun. She also performed "Snow on the Sahara" at the campaign's concert on 19 September 2010 in New York. She got an interview with CNN to talk about this campaign on the same date.  American former athlete Carl Lewis and Anggun will be joining other celebrities in support of the MDG Summit to be held in New York on 22 September 2010. The UN Summit in New York on 20–22 September will bring together close to 150 Heads of State and Government, joined by leaders from the private sector, foundations and civil society, and celebrities, to commit to an action agenda to achieve the MDGs. In November 2011, she made a speech at UN Summit in China.

Writing 

Anggun wrote her views on several issues, especially in Indonesia. She shared those columns on online platforms Qureta.com and DW. She got more than 150,000 online readers.  Mostly she discussed social, humanity, and tolerance topics. On Qureta.com, she uploaded four writings and all in Bahasa:
 "Feminisme dan Solidaritas Maskulin (Feminism and Masculine Solidarity)"
 "Histeria Go-International (Go-International Hysteria)"
 "Cinta adalah Hak Asasi Manusia (Love is a Human Right)"
 "Indonesia dan Sejumlah Klise (Indonesia and Some Clichés)"

On DW, she wrote an article titled "Komunisme dan Emosi Yang Bertautan di Indonesia (Communism and Emotions Are Linked in Indonesia)" and also it uploaded in Bahasa.

Personal life 

Anggun was raised a Muslim:

At the same time she notes that she is not inclined to have a rigid point of view about religion and tends more and more to Buddhism without, in essence, breaking with religious belief. In recognising her disposition to Buddhism, Anggun stresses that her transition to another religious stance should not be a concern of other people. She makes it a requirement to admit religious toleration and insists on a separation of religious faith from the basic regulative principle for the individual:

For me, the most important thing is not what religion you believe in but how you do things, how you live your life.
Your belief doesn't determine whether you're a good person or not—your behavior does.

Anggun has been married four times. Her first marriage, in 1992, was to Michel Georgea, a French engineer. Since he was her manager, Anggun was reproached in Indonesia for allegedly marrying to advance her career. Her second husband was Louis-Olivier Maury (born March 1971) whom she met in Canada. They married in 2004. After her marriage to Olivier Maury ended in 2006, Anggun began a relationship with French writer Cyril Montana, whom she eventually married. She gave birth to her first child, a daughter named Kirana Cipta Montana, on 8 November 2007. She and Montana got divorced in 2015. On 16 August 2018 Anggun married for the fourth time in Ubud, Bali with a German musician and photographer, Christian Kretschmar.

Besides Indonesian, her native language, Anggun is fluent in French and English.

Paris burglary incidents 

According to Closer, Anggun's apartment in Paris was robbed by burglars on 18 September 2015 when she was not in Paris. The burglars have stolen jewelry and high value items for a total amount of around EU€250,000. Theft occurred again in the housing of Anggun on Monday, December 6, 2021, at around 11.00 p.m. in Paris. At that time, Anggun and her family were on vacation in Italy. There were three men who were suspected. They managed to slip into the apartment at the 8th arrondissement of Paris through a window. The robbers stole several luxury items belonging to Anggun, including bags and watches. The amount of the damage would amount to EU€80,000.

Backing band 

Current members
Fabrice Ach – bassist, backing vocals (2001–present)
Olivier Freche – lead guitarist, rhythm guitarist, backing vocals (2004–2011, 2013–present)
Jean-Marie Négozio – keyboardist, backing vocals (2003, 2006–present)
Olivier Baldissera – drummer, percussionist (2008–present)
Stéphane Escoms – back-up keyboardist, backing vocals (2020 (on Italia & Russia tour concerts)–present)

Former members
Patrick Buchmann – drummer, percussionist, backing vocals (1997–2004)
Nicolas-Yvan Mingot – lead guitarist (1997–2000)
Yannick Hardouin – bassist (1997–2001)
Patrice Clémentin – keyboardist (1997–2002)
Serge Bouchard – back-up bassist (1999 (on Asia Tour))
Cyril Tarquiny – lead guitarist, rhythm guitarist, backing vocals (2001–2003, 2006–2007, 2010–2012, 2020 (on Russia tour))
Gilard – keyboardist, backing vocals (2004–2005)
Claude Sarragossa – drummer, percussionist (2005–2007)
Romain Berrodier – back-up keyboardist, backing vocals (2014–2015)
Frédéric Degré – back-up drummer (2019 (on Prambanan Jazz Festival and Gemilang 30 Tahun Concert))

In popular culture 

Anggun became the first Indonesian woman to be immortalized in wax by Madame Tussauds in 2016. Located in its Bangkok museum, Anggun's statue joined that of Sukarno, the first President of Indonesia. A cocktail named after "Anggun" in Bar 228, Hôtel Meurice de Calais, Paris. It made of Bacardi rum, mango coulis, coconut milk, and pineapple juice.

Discography

Studio albums
Dunia Aku Punya (1986)
Anak Putih Abu Abu (1991)
Nocturno (1992)
Anggun C. Sasmi... Lah!!! (1993)
Snow on the Sahara (1997)
Chrysalis (2000)
Luminescence (2005)
Elevation (2008)
Echoes (2011)
Toujours un ailleurs (2015)
8 (2017)

Filmography 

 Film 
Un jour sur Terre (Earth) (2007): as narrator
Ces amours-là (What War May Bring) (2010): as cameo
Silent Night: A Song for the World (2020)
Coup de foudre à Bangkok (2020)
Raya and the Last Dragon (Raya et le dernier Dragon) (2021)

 Television 
Operet Lebaran di Gang Kelinci (1984)
Les Enfoires: Dernière Édition avant l'an 2000 (1999)
E-classement (W9) (2011): as host
Miss France (2008 & 2015)
X Factor Indonesia (season 1) (2013)
Indonesia's Got Talent (season 2) (2014)
Asia's Got Talent (2015 - 2019)
Pondok Pak Cus (2015-2016)
The Voice Indonesia (season 3) (2018)
Les Années bonheur 
Mask Singer (Le Chanteur Masqué) (2019 - 2022)
300 choeurs pour + de vie 
Good Singers (season 1 & 3) (2020 & 2022)
les Reines du Shopping spéciale Célébrités (2021) 
Merci Line (2021)
Chantant Aznavour (2021)
Allez viens je t'emmène dans les années Pop (2021)
Spectaculaire: avec Anggun (France 2) (2022)
Léo Mattéï, Brigade des mineurs (season 9) (2022)
Le livre favori des Français (2022)
Danse avec les stars (season 12) (2022)

 Musical Theatre 
Al Capone & Les Incorruptibles (2023)

 Radio Programme 
Les Pieds dans le plat (Europe 1) (2015 - 2016): as columnist

 Online Series 
Profession Comédien (2019)

Soundtrack

Accolades 

 2001: ranked No. 6 in a list of the Sexiest Women of Asia by FHM magazine.
 2010: FHM 100 Sexiest Women in the World

Bibliography

See also
List of Indonesian musicians and musical groups
List of artists who reached number one on the Italian Singles Chart

References

External links 

 
  

FAO Goodwill Ambassador website

 
Anugerah Musik Indonesia winners
Chevaliers of the Ordre des Arts et des Lettres
English-language singers from Indonesia
Eurovision Song Contest entrants of 2012
Eurovision Song Contest entrants for France
20th-century French women singers
Indonesian emigrants to France
21st-century Indonesian women singers
Indonesian rock singers
Indonesian Buddhists
Indo people
Javanese people
Converts to Buddhism from Islam
Living people
Naturalized citizens of France
Singers from Jakarta
Singers from Paris
World Music Awards winners
FAO Goodwill ambassadors
Warner Music Group artists
Indonesian LGBT rights activists
20th-century Indonesian women singers
21st-century French women singers
1974 births